Smart Alec is a 1951 British crime film directed by John Guillermin and starring Peter Reynolds.

Plot
Young Alec Albion plans successfully to kill his rich uncle with an ice bullet which will melt away, leaving no evidence. He gets an alibi by having the chief commissioner of police living in the same building as his chief witness.

He sets himself up in an apartment overlooking his uncle's. He invites over the new commissioner of police, Sir Randolph, for tea and tells him he has had a premonition about his uncle's murder. The murder is committed.

Sir Randolph is convinced Albion did it, especially after he discovers that the young man was his uncle's heir but was going to be disinherited the following day. He says while they were having tea, Albion went into another room and shot dead his uncle. Randolph has Albion arrested and tried for murder.

Albion is found not guilty. Knowing he cannot be tried twice for the same crime, he confesses to the murder, explaining he shot his uncle with a rifle and a bullet made of ice. Albion talks through the murder with the inspector before realising that he has killed the wrong person: his uncle is still alive! Alec Albion is arrested for the murder which he did commit.

Cast

Original play: Mr Smart Guy

The script was based on a play Mr Smart Guy by Alec Coppel, who wrote it in England at the beginning of the war. They play had originally been called North Light.

Plot
Rex Albion wishes to take possession of a particular flat which is opposite that of his rich uncle. He moves in and invites the chief commissioner of police, Sir Randolph Towe, over for tea. While this happens, the uncle is shot dead while sitting on the balcony... but no bullet is found.

World premiere
The play had its world premiere in Sydney in 1941. It was the first presentation from Whitehall Productions, a new theatrical company established by Coppel and Kathleen Robinson. The profits from the season went to the Red Cross.

The original cast was:
Nigel Lovell as Rex Albion
Harvey Adams as Detective Inspector Ashley
Catherine Duncan as Judith Dyer
Charles Zoli as Cossage, the porter
Richard Parry as Sir Randolph Towle, chief commissioner of police
Leslie Victor as the family lawyer Mr Gruppy
Grant McIntyre as Walter
Charles MeCallum as Mr. Justice Abercorn
Frederick MoMahon as Detective Farr
John MacDougall as Richards
Phil Smith as Mr Hymie
William Constable did the design.

The Sydney Morning Herald reviewer said those who found I Killed the Count "such a soundly-constructed and Ingenious murder mystery will find much to entertain them in his latest offering, despite its weakness and it« lack of sustained Interest... The first act drags, and the second loses its necessary punch and development of tension because its couise of drama Is too often Impeded by comic interference. "

The Daily Telegraph called it "delightful entertainment."

Nonetheless the play was a popular success.

The play was revived at the Minerva in August 1941 for a three-week run with Ron Randell in the lead role and Muriel Steinbeck in the lone female part. The Sydney Morning Herald theatre critic said Randell "failed to explore the subtle aspects of the playwrights study of a criminal exhibitionist."

Radio adaptation
The play was performed on radio on the ABC in May 1941. Max Afford did the adaptation and the original cast reprised their roles.

The play also inspired a song by Sefton Daly which was recorded by Coppel's then-fiancée Myra.

English production
The play was produced in England in 1947 under the title Strange as it May Seem.

Production
Film rights were bought by Vandyke Productions, a short-lived production company founded by brothers Roger and Nigel Proudlock that specialised in low budget pictures. Coppel made some changes to the play in adapting it including adding another female part. The film was shot at Nettlefold Studios, Walton-on-Thames in Surrey. It was filmed back to back with Two on the Tiles and Four Days.

Reception
The Monthly Film Bulletin said "the naivety and absurdity of the story is far surpassed by the acting."

Filmink said "The film is only 55 minutes and is a little silly, but races along. Guillermin does an outstanding job as director, keeping things pacy and brisk; actors are always moving around, the low budget is covered by keeping the action in a few rooms or doing it via close ups (eg  the trial sequence) and there’s a neat final shot with a camera on a car (or something pulling away)."

References

External links

Smart Alec at BFI

1951 films
British crime films
1951 crime films
Films directed by John Guillermin
British black-and-white films
1950s English-language films
1950s British films